Boyd County may refer to:

In Australia 
 Boyd County, New South Wales

In the United States 
 Boyd County, Kentucky 
 Boyd County, Nebraska

United States county name disambiguation pages